The 2015–16 Middle Tennessee Blue Raiders men's basketball team represented Middle Tennessee State University during the 2015–16 NCAA Division I men's basketball season. The Blue Raiders, led by 14th year head coach Kermit Davis, played their home games at the Murphy Center and were members of Conference USA (C-USA). They finished the season 25–10, 13–5 in C-USA play to finish in second place. They defeated Charlotte, Marshall, and Old Dominion to be champions of the C-USA tournament and earn the conference's automatic bid to the NCAA tournament. As a #15 seed, in the first round they upset #2 seed and #2 nationally ranked Michigan State to become the eighth #15 seed to win an NCAA Tournament game. In the second round they lost to Syracuse.

Previous season 
The Blue Raiders finished the 2014–15 season 19–17, 9–9 in C-USA play to finish in sixth place. They advanced to the championship game of the C-USA tournament where they lost to UAB. They were invited to the CollegeInsider.com Tournament where they lost in the first round to Kent State.

Departures

Incoming Transfers

Note: Justin Coleman was a junior college transferred from Mississippi Gulf Coast Community College was going to be enrolled at the start of the fall of 2015. Later, Coleman was dismissed from the team due to violations of team rules.

Recruiting class of 2015

Note: Jalen Perry was a 2015 high school graduate from Louisville, KY was going to be enrolled at the start of the fall of 2015. Later, Perry was dismissed from the team due to violations of team rules.

Roster

Schedule

|-
!colspan=9 style="background:#; color:#FFFFFF;"| Exhibition

|-
!colspan=9 style="background:#; color:#FFFFFF;"| Non-conference regular season

|-
!colspan=9 style="background:#; color:#FFFFFF;"| Conference USA regular season

|-
!colspan=9 style="background:#; color:#FFFFFF;"| Conference USA tournament

|-
!colspan=9 style="background:#; color:#FFFFFF;"| NCAA tournament

References

Middle Tennessee Blue Raiders men's basketball seasons
Middle Tennessee
Middle Tennessee
Middle Tennessee Blue Raiders
Middle Tennessee Blue Raiders